Ashkin is a surname. Notable people with the surname include:

Arthur Ashkin (1922–2020), American physicist, brother of Julius
Julius Ashkin (1920–1982), American physicist
Michael Ashkin (born 1955), American artist

See also
Askin